The 21st Filmfare Awards South Ceremony honoring the winners of the best of South Indian cinema in 1973 is an event held in Shanmukhananda Hall Bombay on 11 April 1974 along with Hindi Awards.

The chief guest of the evening was Chief Minister of Tamil Nadu M. Karunanidhi and Hollywood Actress Diane Baker.

Jury

Awards

Main awards

Kannada cinema

Malayalam cinema

Tamil cinema

Telugu cinema

Special Awards

Awards presentation

 K. S. R. Murthy (Best Film Malayalam) Received Award from Mehtab Modi
 K S Sethumadhavan (Best Director Malayalam) Received Award from Radha Saluja
 Nanditha Bose (Best Actress Malayalam) Received Award from Feroz Khan
 N. Veeraswamy (Best Film Kannada) Received Award from Reena Roy
 S. R. Puttanna Kanagal (Best Director Kannada) Received Award from Neetu Singh
 Jayanthi (Best Actress Kannada) Received Award from Vijay Arora
 Rajkumar (Best Actor Kannada)Received Award from Helen
 Vishnuvardhan (Special Acting Award Kannada) Received Award from Farida Jalal
 D. Rama Naidu (Best Film Telugu) Received Award from Vinod Mehra
 D. Rama Naidu Receives T Rama Rao's Award (Best Director Telugu) from Ambika Johar
 S. V. Venugopal Receives A Nageswara Rao's Award (Best Actor Telugu) from Tariq
 T. Bharathi (Best Film Tamil) Received Award from Sujeet Kumar
 A. C. Tirulokchandar (Best Director Tamil) Received Award from Prem Chopra
 Sivaji Ganesan (Best Actor Tamil) Received Award from Lata Mangeshkar

References

 Filmfare Magazine 5 April 1974
 Filmfare Magazine 3 May 1974

General

External links
 
 

Filmfare Awards South